Shahkot Bandajaat is an administrative unit, known as a union council, of Malakand District in the Khyber Pakhtunkhwa province of Pakistan.

Malakand District has two tehsils, Swat Ranizai and Sam Ranizai. Each tehsil comprises a number of union councils. There are 28 union councils in Malakand.

External links

Khyber-Pakhtunkhwa Government website section on Lower Dir
United Nations
Hajjinfo.org Uploads
PBS paiman.jsi.com

Malakand District
Populated places in Malakand District
Union councils of Khyber Pakhtunkhwa
Union Councils of Malakand District